Carli may refer to:
 Carli (given name), a list of people
 Carli (surname), a list of people
 Çarlı, Azerbaijan, a village and municipality
 Carli Bay, Bay in Trinidad
 Carli Mansion, mansion in Slovenia
 Carli Palace of Verona, palace in Italy
 Čarli TV, TV station in Slovenia
 Hoplocorypha carli, Praying Mantis species native to Rwanda

See also

Dionigi da Palacenza Carli